Elections to Preston Borough Council were held on 7 May 1998.  One third of the council was up for election and the Labour party kept overall control of the council.

After the election, the composition of the council was:

Election result

Wards

Ashton

Avenham

Brookfield

Cadley

Central

Deepdale

Fishwick

Greyfriars

Ingol

Larches

Moor Park

Preston Rural East

Preston Rural West

Ribbleton

Riversway

Sharoe Green

Sherwood

St Matthews

Tulketh

References
"Council poll results", The Guardian 9 May 1998 page 16

1998 English local elections
1998
1990s in Lancashire